Revelation Road is the thirteenth studio album by Shelby Lynne, released on October 18, 2011. On November 18, 2012, Lynne released a deluxe edition that included bonus tracks and a live DVD.

Track listing
All songs written by Shelby Lynne, all vocals by Shelby Lynne, all instruments played by Shelby Lynne.

Chart performance

References

2011 albums
Shelby Lynne albums